Khalid Mohamed is an Indian journalist turned filmmaker.

Khalid Mohammed may also refer to:
 Khalid Abdul Muhammad (1948–2001), black nationalist and supremacist
 Khalid Sheikh Mohammed (1960s–2003), one of the alleged principal architect of the 9/11 attacks
 Khalid Mohammed (footballer) (born 1998), English footballer
 Khaled Mohammed (born 2000), Qatari footballer